The Eastern Conference is one of two conferences in USL Championship soccer.

Current standings

Members

Current

Conference Lineups

Clubs timeline

   
   
   

‡Orlando City B & Rochester Rhinos went on hiatus after the 2017 season.

2015 (12 teams)
Charleston Battery
Charlotte Independence
Harrisburg City Islanders
Louisville City FC
FC Montreal
New York Red Bulls II
Pittsburgh Riverhounds
Richmond Kickers
Rochester Rhinos
St. Louis FC
Toronto FC II
Wilmington Hammerheads
Changes from 2014: USL Pro expanded and was rebranded as simply USL; the round robin table was split into two conferences: Eastern and Western.

2016 (14 teams)
Bethlehem Steel FC
Charleston Battery
Charlotte Independence
FC Cincinnati
FC Montreal
Harrisburg City Islanders
Louisville City FC
New York Red Bulls II
Orlando City B
Pittsburgh Riverhounds
Richmond Kickers
Rochester Rhinos
Toronto FC II
Wilmington Hammerheads

Changes from 2015: Bethlehem Steel FC, FC Cincinnati and Orlando City B were added as expansion franchises; St. Louis FC moved out to the Western Conference.

2017 (15 teams)
Bethlehem Steel FC
Charleston Battery
Charlotte Independence
FC Cincinnati
Harrisburg City Islanders
Louisville City FC
New York Red Bulls II
Orlando City B
Ottawa Fury FC
Pittsburgh Riverhounds
Richmond Kickers
Rochester Rhinos
Saint Louis FC
Tampa Bay Rowdies
Toronto FC II
Changes from 2016: Ottawa Fury FC and the Tampa Bay Rowdies moved in from the North American Soccer League; FC Montreal was disbanded; Saint Louis FC moved back in from the Western Conference; Wilmington Hammerheads FC moved out to the Premier Development League (now USL League Two).

2018 (16 teams)
Atlanta United 2
Bethlehem Steel FC
Charleston Battery
Charlotte Independence
FC Cincinnati
Indy Eleven
Louisville City FC
Nashville SC
New York Red Bulls II
North Carolina FC
Ottawa Fury FC
Penn FC
Pittsburgh Riverhounds
Richmond Kickers
Tampa Bay Rowdies
Toronto FC II
Changes from 2017: USL was divided into three divisions: Championship, League One and League Two; Atlanta United 2 was added as an expansion franchise; the Indy Eleven and North Carolina FC moved in from the North American Soccer League; the Harrisburg City Islanders were renamed Penn FC; Orlando City B and the Rochester Rhinos went on hiatus; Saint Louis FC moved out back to the Western Conference.

2019 (18 teams)
Atlanta United 2
Bethlehem Steel FC
Birmingham Legion FC
Charleston Battery
Charlotte Independence
Hartford Athletic
Indy Eleven
Loudoun United FC
Louisville City FC
Memphis 901 FC
Nashville SC
New York Red Bulls II
North Carolina FC
Ottawa Fury FC
Pittsburgh Riverhounds
Saint Louis FC
Swope Park Rangers
Tampa Bay Rowdies
Changes from 2018:  FC Cincinnati disbanded to make way for the MLS franchise; Birmingham Legion FC, Hartford Athletic, Loudoun United FC and Memphis 901 FC were added as expansion franchises; Saint Louis FC and the Swope Park Rangers moved in from the Western Conference; Orlando City B, 
the Richmond Kickers and Toronto FC II moved out to USL League One; Penn FC and the Rochester Rhinos went on hiatus. They will move to USL League One in 2020.

2020 (17 teams)

Group E (4 teams)
Indy Eleven
Louisville City FC
Saint Louis FC
Sporting Kansas City II

Group F (5 teams)
Hartford Athletic
Loudoun United FC
New York Red Bulls II
Philadelphia Union II
Pittsburgh Riverhounds

Group G (4 teams)
Birmingham Legion FC
Charlotte Independence
Memphis 901 FC
North Carolina FC

Group H (4 teams)
Atlanta United 2
Charleston Battery
Miami FC
Tampa Bay Rowdies

Changes from 2019: Nashville SC moved out to Major League Soccer; Bethlehem Steel FC was renamed Philadelphia Union II; the Swope Park Rangers were renamed Sporting Kansas City II; Ottawa Fury FC was not sanctioned by U.S. Soccer and had their franchise rights sold to Miami FC; Penn FC was disbanded.  In response to the COVID-19 pandemic the conference was split into four groups.  Three groups of four and one group of five.

2021 (16 teams)

Atlantic Division (8 teams)
Charleston Battery
Charlotte Independence
Hartford Athletic
Loudoun United FC
Miami FC
New York Red Bulls II
Pittsburgh Riverhounds SC
Tampa Bay Rowdies

Central Division (8 teams)
Atlanta United 2
Birmingham Legion FC
Indy Eleven
Louisville City FC
Memphis 901 FC
OKC Energy FC
Sporting Kansas City II
FC Tulsa
Changes from 2020: The conference was divided into two divisions, Atlantic and Central; the OKC Energy FC and FC Tulsa moved in from the Western Conference; North Carolina FC moved out to USL League One; Philadelphia Union II was withdrawn by its MLS parent club; Saint Louis FC was disbanded.

2022 (14 teams)
Atlanta United 2
Birmingham Legion FC
Charleston Battery
Detroit City FC
Hartford Athletic
Indy Eleven
Louisville City FC
Loudoun United FC
Memphis 901 FC
Miami FC
New York Red Bulls II
Pittsburgh Riverhounds SC
Tampa Bay Rowdies
FC Tulsa
Changes from 2021: The Atlantic and Central divisions were dropped; OKC Energy FC went on hiatus; Charlotte Independence moved to USL League One; Detroit City FC joined from NISA; Sporting Kansas City II was withdrawn by its MLS parent club and moved to MLS Next Pro.

2023 (12 teams)
Birmingham Legion FC
Charleston Battery
Detroit City FC
Hartford Athletic
Indy Eleven
Louisville City FC
Loudoun United FC
Memphis 901 FC
Miami FC
Pittsburgh Riverhounds SC
Tampa Bay Rowdies
FC Tulsa
Changes from 2022: Atlanta United 2 and New York Red Bulls II were withdrawn by its MLS parent club and moved to MLS Next Pro.

Eastern Conference Playoff champions by year

Eastern Conference regular season champions by year

See also
Western Conference (USL Championship)

References

USL Championship